Kyle Robert Keller (born April 28, 1993) is an American professional baseball pitcher for the Hanshin Tigers of Nippon Professional Baseball (NPB). He has played in Major League Baseball (MLB) for the Miami Marlins, Los Angeles Angels and Pittsburgh Pirates.

Amateur career
Keller attended Jesuit High School in New Orleans, Louisiana. He played college baseball for four seasons (2012–2015) at Southeastern Louisiana University in Hammond, Louisiana.

Professional career

Miami Marlins
The Miami Marlins selected Keller in the 15th round, with the 536th overall selection, of the 2015 MLB draft. He made his professional debut in 2015 with the Class A Short Season Batavia Muckdogs, the Class A Greensboro Grasshoppers, and the Class A-Advanced Jupiter Hammerheads, accumulating a 0–3 record with a 6.26 ERA in 26 innings. He spent the 2016 season with Greensboro, going 3–2 with a 3.35 ERA in 45 innings. In 2017, he repeated the year with Greensboro, going 2–0 with a 2.28 ERA in 67 innings. His 2018 season was split between Jupiter, the Double-A Jacksonville Jumbo Shrimp, and the Triple-A New Orleans Baby Cakes, accumulating a 2–4 record with a 3.08 ERA in 52.2 innings. 	

The Marlins added him to their 40-man roster after the 2018 season. In 2019, he opened the season with Jacksonville, and was promoted to New Orleans on April 9. On August 1, 2019, the Marlins promoted Keller to the major leagues. He made his major league debut on August 4, striking out one batter over  innings pitched.

Keller was designated for assignment on December 20, 2019.

Los Angeles Angels
On January 6, 2020, Keller was traded to the Los Angeles Angels in exchange for Jose Estrada. Keller only made two appearances for the Angels in 2020, giving up two runs in 2.1 innings for a 7.71 ERA with a lone strikeout. On March 31, 2021, Keller was designated for assignment by the Angels.

Pittsburgh Pirates

On April 5, 2021, Keller was traded to the Pittsburgh Pirates in exchange for cash considerations. Keller made 32 appearances for the Pirates, going 1–1 with a 6.48 ERA and 36 strikeouts. On November 6, 2021, Keller was outrighted from the 40-man roster and elected free agency the next day.

Hanshin Tigers
On December 11, 2021, Keller signed with the Hanshin Tigers of Nippon Professional Baseball.

References

External links

1993 births
Living people
People from Metairie, Louisiana
Baseball players from Louisiana
Major League Baseball pitchers
Miami Marlins players
Los Angeles Angels players
Pittsburgh Pirates players
Southeastern Louisiana Lions baseball players
Batavia Muckdogs players
Greensboro Grasshoppers players
Jupiter Hammerheads players
Jacksonville Jumbo Shrimp players
New Orleans Baby Cakes players
Salt River Rafters players
Indianapolis Indians players
Jesuit High School (New Orleans) alumni